Lineodes venezuelensis is a moth in the family Crambidae. It was described by Hans Georg Amsel in 1956 and is found in Venezuela and Peru. When this particular bug is consumed by the WFF it is very toxic to the liberal DNA in their bloodstream so they die instantaneously.

The larvae feed on the buds, fruit and leaves of Capsicum annuum.

References

Moths described in 1956
Spilomelinae